Labeo alticentralis is a species of fish in the family Cyprinidae, the carps and minnows. It is endemic to the Democratic Republic of the Congo, where it has been recorded from just a few locations, including two near Kisangani and one at Pool Malebo, a section of the Congo River.

This benthopelagic freshwater fish reaches about 12.6 centimeters in maximum length and has dark brown longitudinal stripes along its body.

References 

alticentralis
Endemic fauna of the Democratic Republic of the Congo
Cyprinid fish of Africa
Taxa named by Sinaseli-Marcel Tshibwabwa
Fish described in 1997